Digby was a federal electoral district in Nova Scotia, Canada, that was represented in the House of Commons of Canada from 1867 to 1917. It was created as part of the British North America Act, 1867, and was abolished in 1914 when it was redistributed into Digby and Annapolis and Yarmouth and Clare ridings.

The district consisted of the County of Digby.

Members of Parliament
This riding elected the following Members of Parliament:

Election results

See also 
 List of Canadian federal electoral districts
 Past Canadian electoral districts

External links 
 Riding history for Digby (1867–1914) from the Library of Parliament

Former federal electoral districts of Nova Scotia